The 1995–96 Moldovan "A" Division season is the 5th since its establishment. A total of 22 teams are contesting the league.

League table

Promotion/relegation play-off
22 June 1996
FC Torentul Chișinău 0–2 Victoria Cahul
Nistru Cioburciu  awd Attila Ungheni

[Awarded to Attila, Nistru C didn't show up.]

Attila and Victoria were promoted to the Divizia Națională.

References
 Moldova. Second Level 1995/96 - RSSSF

External links
 "A" Division - moldova.sports.md

Moldovan Liga 1 seasons
2
Moldova